This article contains papers in paleobotany that were published in 2016.

Bryophytes

Ferns and fern allies

Conifers

Cycads

Gingkophytes

"Pteridospermatophytes"

Glossopteridales

Medullosales

Other pteridospermatophytes

Other seed plants

Flowering plants

Other plants

Research
 Extensive plant traces preserved in fossil soils are described from Early Devonian deposits of Xujiachong Formation in Yunnan (China) by Xue et al. (2016), who interpret the traces as belowground rhizomes of the basal lycopsid Drepanophycus.
 A description of the rooting system preserved in basal lycophyte fossils from the Devonian Beartooth Butte Formation (Wyoming, United States) is published by Matsunaga & Tomescu (2016).
 Fossils of the fern Acrostichum lanzaeanum are described from the Oligocene La Val fossil site (Huesca Province, Spain) by Moreno-Domínguez et al. (2016), who interpret the fossils as indicating that in Oligocene Acrostichum grew and developed as a pioneering plant in disturbed environments, such as floodplain areas.
 A study on the phylogenetic relationships of Pseudoasterophyllites cretaceus is published by Kvaček et al. (2018).
 Fossil fruit of a member of the genus Cornus related to Cornus piggae is described from the Late Cretaceous (late Campanian) Spray Formation (British Columbia, Canada) by Atkinson, Stockey & Rothwell (2016).

References

Paleobotany
Paleontology
2016 in paleontology